Armando is the first Spanish album and fifth studio album by Cuban-American rapper Pitbull. It was released on November 2, 2010 through Mr. 305 Inc. and Sony Latino. The album features production by multiple producers including Afrojack, DJ Buddha, DJ Antoine, Clinton Sparks and DJ Snake. 

Armando spawned four singles: "Watagatapitusberry", "Maldito Alcohol", "Bon, Bon" and "Tu Cuerpo". The singles received airplay on Spanish radio and in Latin American countries. According to a review by Allmusic, the album is named after Pitbull's father (and also, his real name). Armando won the Lo Nuestro Award for Urban Album of the Year.

Track listing

Charts

Weekly charts

Weekly charts

Certifications

See also
List of number-one Billboard Latin Rhythm Albums of 2010

References

External links 
 Armando on Spotify

Albums produced by Lil Jon
Pitbull (rapper) albums
J Records albums
2010 albums
Spanish-language albums